is a female Japanese beach volleyball player. Referred to in media reports as the "pixie of beach volleyball" or simply "pixie of the beach" for her good looks, Asao helped to popularize beach volleyball in Japan. She became a national celebrity from the many articles written on her in Japanese magazines and newspapers, and through her numerous appearances on television.

Education
Asao attended Mie Prefecture Tatsutsu Commercial High School.

Career
After graduating from high school, she signed a contract with artist Kawahe Shunichi to develop her career as a beach volleyball player and model.

She started her volleyball career in 2000 and officially became a beach volleyball player in 2004.

Retirement
On December 10, 2012, Asao announced her retirement.

On April 2, 2013, she married an ordinary person.

On December 16, 2014, a baby boy was born.

On November 27, 2016, a second baby boy was born.

References

External links 

 Official website 
 Official blog 
 
 

1986 births
Living people
Japanese beach volleyball players
Japanese women's beach volleyball players
Japanese women's volleyball players
People from Mie Prefecture
21st-century Japanese women